The Ministry of Information Technology and Telecommunication, abbreviated as MoITT) is a Cabinet-level ministry of the Government of Pakistan concerned with Information Technology and Telecommunications.

Organizations

Pakistan Telecommunication Authority

Pakistan Telecommunication Authority (PTA) is a telecom sector Regulator responsible for the establishment, operation and maintenance of telecommunications in Pakistan.

National Telecommunication Corporation

National Telecommunication Corporation (NTC) is a government-based IT and Telecom services provider corporation in Pakistan. NTC provides ICT service to Federal Government, Armed Forces, Defense Projects, Provincial Governments and to all Government Institutions.

Pakistan Software Export Board

Pakistan Software Export Board (PSEB) is an apex Government body mandated to promote Pakistan's IT Industry in local and international markets. PSEB facilitates the IT industry through a series of projects and programs in infrastructure development, human capital development, company capability development, international marketing, strategy and research and the promotion of innovation and technologies.

National IT Board
National Information Technology Board (NITB) or National IT Board was established in 2014 by merging Pakistan Computer Bureau and the Electronic Government Directorate.

Special Communication Organization

SCO is a public sector organization under the administrative control of the Ministry of IT & Telecom, established in 1976 to develop, operate and maintain telecom services in Azad Jammu & Kashmir and Gilgit Baltistan.

Telecom Foundation
Telecom Foundation (TF) is a Trust established for the Welfare of employees of public sector organizations in telecom sector. It achieves its targets through profit generation by setting-up Industrial Ventures and undertaking Commercial and service activities. It has established a number of Limited Companies.

Universal Service Fund 

Universal Service Fund company was established by the Government under Companies Ordinance 1984 to spread the benefits of the telecom revolution to all corners of Pakistan. Universal Service Fund promotes the development of telecommunication services in un-served and under-served areas throughout the country.
The fund consists of contributions (1.5% of adjusted revenues) by the Telecom Operators with no Government funding involved. 
Universal Service Fund (USF) has an independent Board of Directors equally balanced between four members from the government and four from the private sector. The USF company in addition to rolling next generation broadband technology projects in under served and un served area of Pakistan, is also undertaking ICT for Girls program training young girls in coding and cloud computing skills.

Virtual University of Pakistan

The Virtual University is Pakistan’s first University based completely on modern Information and Communication Technologies, was established by the Government as a public sector and not-for-profit institution.

Ignite National Technology Fund

The Ignite (National Technology Fund) company (Formerly National ICT R&D Fund) was established in January 2007 by Ministry of Information Technology & Telecom. The purpose behind the establishment of this R&D Fund is to support research and development projects proposed by industry and academia. This R&D fund is contributed in the form of a certain percentage of gross revenue generated by all telecom service providers in Pakistan.
Ignite is undertaking some landmark projects in the country including National Incubation Centres and Digiskills program.

See also 
 Communications in Pakistan
 Information technology in Pakistan
 Ministry of Maritime Affairs(Pakistan)
 Pakistan Telecommunication Company Limited (PTCL)

References

External links
 MoITT official website

Information Technology
Communications ministries
Telecommunications in Pakistan